Peter Prince (born 10 May 1942) is a British novelist. He was born in England and studied in America. His first novel Play Things won the Somerset Maugham Award in 1973. He won an Emmy Award for Outstanding Writing in a Limited Series or a Special for his work on the 1980 BBC miniseries Oppenheimer. His 1983 novel The Good Father was adapted into a film starring Anthony Hopkins. His latest novel Adam Runaway was published in 2005.

References

Living people
1942 births
British male novelists
20th-century British novelists
21st-century British novelists
Place of birth missing (living people)